{{album reviews|noprose=yes
| rev1      = Allmusic
| rev1Score = 
| rev2      = Detroit Free Press
| rev2Score = 
| rev3      = Dirty Linen
| rev3Score = Unfavorable<ref name = "DLinen">Lahri Bond, "Recordings: Old Futures Gone", Dirty Linen, April/May 2004 (Quotes: "The result is not always pleasing, as Gorka has built a career on deeply meaningful and witty songs crooned out in a voice that is deep and rich as butterscotch. One would never deny an artist his right to grow and change, but not all of those changes are successful." / "The problem is both in the lack of depth in the song's lyrics, coupled with the deadly disease shared by most American singer/songwriters who believe that a cleverly constructed set of rhymes makes for a good sting. Songs should never be reduced to writing exercises. Gorka had never fallen into the trap of formula – until now." / "This is not to say that this is a bad album. There are some great moments, even on the hook-laden "War Makes War" and "Trouble & Care, but songs such as "Outside" seem like pointless reworking of older material.")</ref>
| rev4      = Harp| rev4Score = Favorable
| rev5      = PopMatters
| rev5Score = Mixed
| rev6      = Rambles
| rev6Score = Favorable
| rev7      = Sing Out!| rev7Score = Favorable
| rev8      = Sydney Morning Herald| rev8Score = Favorable
}}Old Futures Gone is the ninth studio album by folk singer-songwriter John Gorka. It was released on September 23, 2003, by Red House Records.  The album debuted at number two on the Folk Music Radio Airplay Chart'' and reached number one in October 2003. Gorka shares writing credit with his wife, Laurie Allman, for the lyrics of "Trouble and Care".

Lucy Kaplansky, Alice Peacock, Kathleen Johnson and Joel Sayles each add harmony vocals to various tracks.

Track listing 
 "Dogs & Thunder" (Gorka) – 5:20 
 "Always" (Gorka) – 3:55 
 "Look the Other Way" (Gorka) – 3:11 
 "Outside" (Gorka) – 4:48 
 "Trouble & Care" (Allmann, Gorka) – 4:16 
 "Make Them Crazy" (Gorka) – 3:15 
 "Old Future" (Gorka) – 3:55 
 "Lay Me Down" (Gorka) – 4:18 
 "Shapes" (Gorka) – 3:49 
 "Soldier After All" (Gorka) – 4:27 
 "Poor Side" (Gorka) – 4:46 
 "War Makes War" (Gorka) – 4:06 
 "If Not Now" (Gorka) – 1:33 
 "Riverside" (Gorka) – 4:01

Personnel 

Marc Anderson – Percussion, Drums 
Jim Anton – Bass 
Rick Barnes – Engineer 
J. T. Bates – Drums 
Zack Bates – Assistant Engineer 
Dirk Freymuth – Guitar (Electric) 
Rob Genadek – Percussion, Tambourine, producer, engineer, Mixing 
John Gorka – Guitar (Acoustic), Banjo, Vocals 
Kathleen Johnson – Harmony Vocals 
Lucy Kaplansky – Harmony Vocals 
Carla Leighton – Art Direction, Design 
Noah Levy – Drums 
Dean Magraw – Guitar (Electric) 
Ann Marsden – Photography 
John Munson – Bass 
Gene Paul – Mastering 
Alice Peacock – Harmony Vocals 
Rob & The Players – Arranger 
Joel Sayles – Harmony Vocals 
Enrique Toussaint – Bass 
Jeff Victor – Keyboards 
Ben Wittman – Engineer

References

External links 
 John Gorka, official web site
 Old Futures Gone page from Red House Records
 "John Gorka Pleases in Piermont", by Vinny Cohan WDFH-FM 90.3 (Review of live performance, January 18, 2004)

John Gorka albums
2003 albums
Red House Records albums